Nemanja Milojević (born 23 February 1998) is a Greek professional footballer of Serbian origin who plays as a winger for Voždovac.

Born in Athens, the capital of Greece where his father Vladan Milojević played for a period, Nemanja represented Greece under-19 level. He also holds both Greek and Serbian citizenship.

Club career

Čukarički
As a product of FK Čukarički youth academy, Milojević signed his first professional contract with the club in December 2015 along with several other teammates from the class, being assigned number 56 jersey. He continued playing with the youth team, enjoying great success as a member of a generation which won the Serbian youth league and promotion in 2016–17 UEFA Youth League.

During the 2016–17 Serbian SuperLiga campaign, Milojević trained with the first squad, but without official matches in the first half-season. Previously, he changed his squad number to 54. Milojević made his debut for the first team of FK Čukarički under coach Nenad Lalatović in a Serbian Cup match against Sloboda Užice, played on 5 April 2017. Shortly after he came on as a substitute, he scored his first senior goal in official match. He made his first start on 33rd matchday of the 2016–17 season, against Metalac Gornji Milanovac.

In summer 2017, Milojević became a fully senior player and was assigned squad number 20. At the beginning of the 2017–18 Serbian SuperLiga season, he was elected for vice-captain behind Petar Bojić. During the first half-season in the domestic football competition, he scored in home victories against Voždovac, Vojvodina and Rad. In the mid-season, he refused to sign a new contract with the club. Milojević left the club as a free agent after the end of season.

Vojvodina
After the end of the 2017–18 Serbian SuperLiga campaign and his contract with former club, it was announced Vojvodina expressed an interest in Milojević. On 18 June 2018, Milojević officially joined new club, penning a three-year deal.

Panionios
On 5 August 2019, he signed a three-year contract with Greek Superleague club Panionios.

Voždovac
On 18 September 2020, he signed a contract with Serbian SuperLiga club Voždovac.

International career
In early years of his career, Milojević had been called into the Serbia national under-17 football team. He also played for Serbian under-18 level, in friendly matches against Bosnia and Herzegovina in 2016. Later, Nemanja represented Greece under-19 level between 2016 and 2017. In March 2018, Milojević was invited to Greece under-21 level under coach Antonios Nikopolidis. He made his debut for Greece under-21 national team in 4–3 friendly game away loss to Slovakia.

Career statistics

Club

References

External links
 
 
 
 

1998 births
Living people
Footballers from Athens
Greek footballers
Association football midfielders
Serbian footballers
Greece youth international footballers
Greece under-21 international footballers
FK Čukarički players
FK Vojvodina players
Serbian SuperLiga players
Greek people of Serbian descent